Iloilo Business Park, also known just as Megaworld among the locals (after the developer's name), is a  mixed-use master-planned community development in Mandurriao, Iloilo City, Philippines by Megaworld Corporation. It is located on the site of Iloilo's former airport, Mandurriao Airport, which the conglomerate acquired for 1.2 Billion Pesos from the Philippine national government. Megaworld is projected to pour in ₱25 Billion for the entire development in a span of years. It is an integrated township project featuring a commercial district, a lifestyle mall, office buildings catering to business process outsourcing firms, boutique and deluxe hotels, and a convention center.

Initial development includes construction of a road network, the 12-storey Richmonde Hotel Iloilo and Richmonde Tower, Festive Walk, Two Business Process Outsourcing office buildings. The IT complex has been certified as an information technology park by the Philippine Economic Zone Authority (PEZA), granting locators perks such as tax holidays and duty-free importation of equipment among others.

Megaworld is setting aside a 9.7-hectare lot for the boutique hotel and commercial district which is being offered to interested business owners.

Iloilo Business Park increased by an additional 18 hectares, bringing the project to roughly 72 hectares from its initial 54.5 hectare-size.
This is due to the increasing demand for residential and commercial properties and good reception to Megaworld's first development in the region and biggest township in the Visayas, modeled after the live-work-play approach that it claims to have pioneered in the Philippines.

Residential

One Madison Place Luxury Residences is Megaworld's 1,700-square meter residential development within Iloilo Business Park. It consists of three 10-story mid-rise towers along Megaworld Boulevard.

Lafayette Park Square is Megaworld's second condominium project within the business park. The 14-story single tower features French and Spanish architectural designs.

The Palladium, introduced in October 2014, is cited to be the tallest modern luxury residential condominium in Western Visayas. Standing 80 meters high at 22 stories, The Palladium will also be the region's first residential tower with its own skygardens in various floors overlooking Iloilo. At the topmost floor of the tower, there will be exclusive loft units ranging from 76 square meters to 115 square meters.

The fourth and fifth residential projects in the township launched in 2017, Saint Honore and Saint Dominique, are inspired by Parisian lifestyle. It will have ten levels with 168 and 152 units respectively. Both towers will share a common podium and amenity areas. Both condominiums will have 2nd towers each.

The sixth condominium in the township, The Pinnacle, is a 20-storey luxury residential project of Megaworld. It will be built adjacent to the International Corporate Plaza and Courtyard by Marriott - Iloilo hotel.

Office buildings

Three Megaworld office towers were initially developed to cater mainly to business process outsourcing companies. They combine a total of 25,000 square meters of leasable space and could accommodate a total of 10,000 employees. These are One Global Center, Two Global Center and the Richmonde Tower which also houses the Richmonde Hotel Iloilo. Construction of two more office buildings, namely One Techno Place and Two Techno Place, commenced last 2015 and are set to occupy a total of 19,000 square meters of leasable space housing an additional 8,000 employees.

Other IT-BPO office towers in the township include the Festive Walk Parade Tower, One Fintech Place, and Two Fintech Place.

In addition to the office edifices housing mostly to IT-BPO companies, there are also planned corporate office towers in the pipeline that will be built in the township. Notable of which is the International Corporate Plaza, a 19-storey tower with leasable spaces for corporate tenants. It will be the first green designed office tower in the Western Visayas region. Banks such as Metrobank and UnionBank of the Philippines has in their plans to build their regional corporate office towers in Iloilo Business Park.

Hotels
 
 Richmonde Hotel Iloilo will occupy the ground floor and 7th to 12th floors of the Iloilo Richmonde Tower. It hosts 90 guest rooms and cater to businessmen and tourists. It is the first Richmonde Hotel outside Manila.
Courtyard by Marriott Iloilo is built under Marriott International through Megaworld Corporation. The 15-storey hotel houses 314 rooms and suites. The hotel opened on May 1, 2018 as the first Courtyard by Marriott development in the Philippines and also the first Marriott-branded hotel in Visayas and Mindanao twenty years after the opening of Marriott Cebu (rebranded as Seda Cebu).
Belmont Hotel Iloilo will be soon built near the St. Honore and St. Dominique condominium towers. A 12-storey hotel, it will be the first Belmont Hotel brand in Western Visayas and Mindanao.

Commercial

The Festive Walk Iloilo is the first stand alone lifestyle mall by Megaworld in Visayas and Mindanao and the first upscale mall in Iloilo. It has two buildings (Main with 3 levels + Annex with 3 levels) housing shops, restaurants, facilities including cinemas and "event centers". The Marketplace by Rustan's occupies as the main supermarket chain in the mall. It will also feature a separate structure which will house the Metro Department Store and Supermarket.

There is also the Festive Walk Parade, a 1.1-kilometer outdoor commercial and retail strip, which will be the longest shopping and dining strip in the Philippines. The first phase had a soft opening last December 20, 2016 with a grand opening happening in January 2017. Succeeding phases will be completed on 2018.

Iloilo Convention Center
The Iloilo Convention Center stands on a 1.7-hectare lot donated by MegaWord, the same site formerly occupied by the apron and terminal of Mandurriao Airport. It was funded by the Tourism Infrastructure and Enterprise Zone Authority (TIEZA) and the Priority Development Assistance Fund (PDAF) of Senator Franklin Drilon.

Museums and art galleries

Iloilo Museum of Contemporary Art (ILOMOCA) - The first contemporary and modern art museum in Visayas and Mindanao (first Megaworld-built museum in the Philippines), it houses artworks of local and international artists like Salvador Dalí.
Brandy Museum - The first brandy museum in the Philippines.

Transport Hub

In March 2019, the Land Transportation Franchising and Regulatory Board announced the opening of a new Premium Point-to-Point Bus Service in Iloilo Business Park Transport hub with express bus services to the airports in Cabatuan, Kalibo and Boracay (Caticlan).

References

External links
 
 https://web.archive.org/web/20130716101023/http://www.megaworldcorp.com/Projects/Office.aspx

Buildings and structures in Iloilo City
Business parks of the Philippines
Shopping districts and streets in the Philippines
Planned communities in the Philippines